Nathalie Sinclair-Desgagné is a Canadian politician who was elected to represent the riding of Terrebonne in the House of Commons of Canada in the 2021 Canadian federal election.

Biography
Sinclair-Desgagné was educated at McGill University, where she graduated in economics. She has a Master's Degree from the University of Oxford. Prior to being elected, she was a senior economic advisor to the general management of the City of Montreal. She has also worked for Deloitte and PwC.

References

External links

Living people
Bloc Québécois MPs
Members of the House of Commons of Canada from Quebec
People from Terrebonne, Quebec
Women members of the House of Commons of Canada
21st-century Canadian women politicians
21st-century Canadian politicians
1980s births
Canadian women economists
McGill University alumni
Alumni of the University of Oxford
Deloitte people
PricewaterhouseCoopers people